Brazil competed at the 2011 World Aquatics Championships in Shanghai, China between July 16 and 31, 2011.

Medalists

Diving

Brazil has qualified 3 athletes in diving.

Men

Open water swimming

Men

Women

Swimming

Brazil qualified 21 swimmers.

Men

Women

Synchronised swimming

Brazil has qualified 10 athletes in synchronised swimming.

Women

Reserves
Jessica Goncalves

Water polo

Men

Team Roster 

Marcelo Chagas
Emilio Vieira
Henrique Miranda
Bernardo Gomes
Marcelo Franco
Gustavo Guimarães
Jonas Crivella
Felipe Silva – Captain
Bernardo Rocha
Joao Felipe Coelho
Danilo Correa
Vinicius Antonelli

Group C

Classification 13–16

Thirteenth place game

Women

Team Roster

Tess Flore Helene Oliveira
Cecilia Canetti
Izabella Maizza Chiappini
Marina Canetti
Marina Aranha Zablith
Gabriela Leme Gozani
Cristina de Camargo Beer – Captain
Luiza Avila Carvalho
Fernanda Palma Lissoni
Mirella de Coutinho
Ruda Franco
Maria Barbara Kernebeis Amaro
Gabriela Mantellato Dias
Manuela Canetti

Group C

Classification 13–16

Thirteenth place game

References

Nations at the 2011 World Aquatics Championships
2011
World Aquatics Championships